Francesca Boscarelli (born 27 May 1982) is an Italian épée fencer, team gold medallist at the 2007 European Championships and team bronze medallist at the 2009 Summer Universiade.

Career
Boscarelli started fencing at the age of twelve at CS Sannita in her native town of Benevento under the guidance of Carmine Bozzella. After earning her first regional and national successes she transferred to Naples where she trained with Sandro Cuomo. In 2007, she joined CS Esercito, the sport section of the Italian Army. She won her first senior national championship and earned a team gold medal at the 2007 European Championships in Ghent, followed by a team bronze medal at the 2008 edition in Kiev. She was also a member of the Italian team that took a bronze medal in 2009 Summer Universiade in Belgrade.

She climbed her first World Cup podium with a bronze medal at the 2010 Montreal Grand Prix. In the 2014–15 season she won the Rio de Janeiro Grand Prix.

References

External links
  at the Italian Fencing Federation
 Profile at the European Fencing Confederation

Italian female épée fencers
Universiade medalists in fencing
Living people
1982 births
Sportspeople from Benevento
Universiade bronze medalists for Italy
Medalists at the 2009 Summer Universiade